Mesodmops is a genus of small mammal from the Eocene of China.  It was a late member of the extinct order of Multituberculata. It's within the suborder of Cimolodonta and family Neoplagiaulacidae. The genus was named by Y. Tong and T. Wang in 1994.

The primary species is Mesodmops dawsonae, also named by Tong and Wang. It has been found in the Lower Eocene of the Wutu Basin in Shandong, China.

References 
Tong & Wang (1994), A new neoplagiaulacid multituberculate (Mammalia) from the lower Eocene of Wutu Basin, Shandong. Vertebrata PalAsiatica, 32, p. 275-284. (Chinese with summary in English.)
Kielan-Jaworowska Z. and Hurum J.H. (2001), Phylogeny and Systematics of multituberculate mammals. Paleontology 44, p. 389-429.
 Most of this information has been derived from  MESOZOIC MAMMALS; Ptilodontoidea, an Internet directory.

Ptilodontoids
Eocene mammals
Fossils of China
Prehistoric mammal genera